Idmon sinica is a butterfly in the family Hesperiidae. It was first described by H. Huang in 1997. It is found in China.

References

Butterflies described in 1997
Ancistroidini